Throcking is a village and former civil parish, now in the parish of Cottered, in the East Hertfordshire district, in the county of Hertfordshire, England. It is approximately 1.5 miles west-northwest of Buntingford and 7 miles east-northeast of Stevenage.  In 1951 the civil parish had a population of 139. On the 1 April 1955 the civil parish was merged into Cottered. Throcking was recorded in the Domesday Book as Trochinge.

Notable residents

Thomas Soame (1584-1671), English politician
Sir Leonard Hyde, High Sheriff of Hertfordshire in 1606
Amy Robsart (1532-1560), first wife of Sir Robert Dudley, 1st Earl of Leicester (1532-1588)
Leonard Arthur Hawes (1892-1986), British army officer responsible for B.E.F transport to France

References

External links

Villages in Hertfordshire
Former civil parishes in Hertfordshire
East Hertfordshire District